Aluminothermic reactions are exothermic chemical reactions using aluminum as the reducing agent at high temperature.  The process is industrially useful for production of alloys of iron. The most prominent example is the thermite reaction between iron oxides and aluminum to produce iron itself:

 Fe2O3  +  2 Al   →   2 Fe  +  Al2O3

This specific reaction is however not relevant to the most important application of aluminothermic reactions, the production of ferroalloys.  For the production of iron, a cheaper reducing agent, coke, is used instead via the carbothermic reaction.

History
Aluminothermy started from the experiments of Russian scientist Nikolay Beketov at the University of Kharkiv in Ukraine, who proved that aluminum restored metals from their oxides under high temperatures. The reaction was first used for the carbon-free reduction of metal oxides. The reaction is highly exothermic, but it has a high activation energy since strong interatomic bonds in the solids must be broken first. The oxide was heated with aluminum in a crucible in a furnace. The runaway reaction made it possible to produce only small quantities of material. Hans Goldschmidt improved the aluminothermic process between 1893 and 1898, by igniting the mixture of fine metal oxide and aluminum powder by a starter reaction without heating the mixture externally. The process was patented in 1898 and used extensively in the later years for rail track welding.

Applications
The aluminothermic reaction is used for the production of several ferroalloys, for example ferroniobium from niobium pentoxide and ferrovanadium from iron, vanadium(V) oxide, and aluminum. The process begins with the reduction of the oxide by the aluminum:
3 V2O5  +  10 Al  →   5 Al2O3  +  6 V

Other metals can be produced from their oxides in the same way.

Aluminothermic reactions have been used for welding rail tracks on-site, useful for complex installations or local repairs that cannot be done using continuously welded rail.  Another common use is the welding of copper cables (wire) for use in direct burial (grounding/earthing) applications. It is still the only type of electrical connection recognized by the IEEE (IEEE, Std 80-2001) as continuous un-spliced cable.

See also
 Thermite
 Calciothermic reaction
 Silicothermic reaction

References

Inorganic reactions
Metallurgy
Russian inventions
Ukrainian inventions